In mathematics, a relation on a set is called connected or complete or total if it relates (or "compares") all  pairs of elements of the set in one direction or the other while it is called strongly connected if it relates  pairs of elements.  As described in the terminology section below, the terminology for these properties is not uniform. This notion of "total" should not be confused with that of a total relation in the sense that for all  there is a  so that  (see serial relation).

Connectedness features prominently in the definition of total orders: a total (or linear) order is a partial order in which any two elements are comparable; that is, the order relation is connected. Similarly, a strict partial order that is connected is a strict total order.
A relation is a total order if and only if it is both a partial order and strongly connected. A relation is a strict total order if, and only if, it is a strict partial order and just connected. A strict total order can never be strongly connected (except on an empty domain).

Formal definition 

A relation  on a set  is called  when for all  

or, equivalently, when for all 

A relation with the property that for all  

is called .

Terminology 

The main use of the notion of connected relation is in the context of orders, where it is used to define total, or linear, orders. In this context, the property is often not specifically named. Rather, total orders are defined as partial orders in which any two elements are comparable.
Thus,  is used more generally for relations that are connected or strongly connected. However, this notion of "total relation" must be distinguished from the property of being serial, which is also called total.  Similarly, connected relations are sometimes called , although this, too, can lead to confusion: The universal relation is also called complete, and "complete" has several other meanings in order theory.
Connected relations are also called  or said to satisfy  (although the more common definition of trichotomy is stronger in that  of the three options  must hold).

When the relations considered are not orders, being connected and being strongly connected are importantly different properties.

Characterizations 

Let  be a homogeneous relation. The following are equivalent:
  is strongly connected;
 ;
 ;
  is asymmetric,

The following are equivalent:
  is connected;
 ;
 ;
  is antisymmetric,

Introducing progressions, Russell invoked the axiom of connection:

Properties 

 The  relation  of a tournament graph  is always a connected relation on the set of s vertices.
 If a strongly connected relation is symmetric, it is the universal relation.
 A relation is strongly connected if, and only if, it is connected and reflexive.
 A connected relation on a set  cannot be antitransitive, provided  has at least 4 elements. On a 3-element set  for example, the relation  has both properties.

Notes 

Proofs

References

Binary relations